Clive Lindsay Fairbairn  (25 August 1919 – 12 May 2010) was an Australian cricketer. He played one first-class cricket match for Victoria in 1948.

Fairbairn was awarded the Medal of the Order of Australia in 1990 for "service to the sport of cricket".

See also
 List of Victoria first-class cricketers

References

External links
 

1919 births
2010 deaths
Australian cricketers
Victoria cricketers
Cricketers from Melbourne
Recipients of the Medal of the Order of Australia